"In" Jazz for the Culture Set is the debut album led by the American jazz drummer Dannie Richmond recorded in 1965 and released on the Impulse! label.

Reception
The Allmusic review by Ken Dryden awarded the album 2 stars stating "Drummer Dannie Richmond's debut recording as a leader looks promising on the surface... But the album is dragged down by a poor choice of material".

Track listing
 "High Camp" (Gary McFarland) – 3:06
 "Sweet Little Sixteen" (Chuck Berry) – 2:14
 "Freedom Ride" (Jimmy Raney) – 3:02
 "The Spider" (Jaki Byard) – 3:55
 "Blowin' in the Wind" (Bob Dylan) – 2:40
 "Pfoofnick" (McFarland) – 4:20
 "The Berkeley Underground" (Byard) – 4:52
 "Mister Nashville" (Toots Thielmans) – 3:55
 "John Kennedy Memory Waltz" (George Weiss) – 2:09

Personnel
Dannie Richmond – drums
Toots Thielemans – harmonica, guitar
Jaki Byard – piano
Jimmy Raney – guitar
Cecil McBee – bass
Willie Bobo, Victor Pantoja – percussion

References

Impulse! Records albums
Dannie Richmond albums
1965 debut albums
Albums recorded at Van Gelder Studio
Albums produced by Bob Thiele
Instrumental albums